Events in the year 1992 in Cyprus.

Incumbents 

 President: Demetris Christofias
 President of the Parliament: Yiannakis Omirou

Events 
Ongoing – Cyprus dispute

 25 March – Eurocypria Airlines Limited, a charter airline owned by the government of Cyprus, was founded.

Deaths

References 

 
1990s in Cyprus
Years of the 21st century in Cyprus
Cyprus
Cyprus
Cyprus